Steven W. Van Sciver is an American mechanical engineer, having been John H. Gorrie Professor (1996-1997) at Florida State University.

References

Year of birth missing (living people)
Living people
Florida State University faculty
American mechanical engineers